Neolucoppia is a genus of mites belonging to the family Oribatulidae.

Species:

Neolucoppia luculenta

References

Sarcoptiformes